George S. Winslow (born April 6, 1829) was a politician from South Dedham, later Norwood, Massachusetts.

Winslow was born April 6, 1829, in South Dedham, Massachusetts, which later became Norwood, and was educated in the public schools. He was the senior partner of the firm of Winslow Brothers, tanners of sheep leather. In 1892, as the representative from the First Norfolk District, he served on the committees on mercantile affairs and parishes and religious societies.

References

Democratic Party members of the Massachusetts House of Representatives
People from Norwood, Massachusetts
Politicians from Dedham, Massachusetts
1829 births
Year of death missing